Güllük is a small harbor quarter within the district of Milas, situated north of Bodrum in the Muğla Province of Turkey. It is a small Turkish town and a growing holiday destination.

Transport
Güllük is only 9 km. away from Milas-Bodrum Airport (BJV), which makes the town easily accessible. Bodrum is approximately 42 km. from Güllük. There are shuttle minivans connecting Güllük to Milas and Bodrum.

See also 

 Turkish Riviera

www.gulluk.net

References

Milas District
Populated places in Muğla Province
Towns in Turkey
Turkish Riviera
Populated coastal places in Turkey
Aegean Sea port cities and towns in Turkey
Fishing communities in Turkey